The Aimeliik Power Plant is a fossil fuel power station in Aimeliik, Palau.

History
The power plant was commissioned in 1984.

Generation units
Currently the power plant consists of 4 installed diesel generators with a total installed capacity of 13.08 MW.

References

1984 establishments in Oceania
Energy infrastructure completed in 1984
Oil-fired power stations in Palau